Sidney Clifford Brookfield Yorke (1922–2007), was a British Psychiatrist at the Maudsley Hospital who in 1945 while studying medicine at King's College Hospital, assisted at Bergen-Belsen concentration camp as a voluntary medical student. He took over from Anna Freud at the Hamstead Clinic.

See also
List of London medical students who assisted at Belsen

References

20th-century British medical doctors
London medical students who assisted at Belsen
1945 in medicine
1922 births
2007 deaths